Heliopetes ericetorum, the northern white-skipper, is a butterfly of the family Hesperiidae. It is found in North America in the United States from eastern Washington south to western Colorado, southern California and Arizona, and in Baja California in north-western Mexico. The habitat consists of open woodland, chaparral, dry washes, desert mountains and arid lands.

Adults are on wing from April to October.

Larvae feed on the leaves of mallow species, including Sphaeralcea, Althaea and Malva species.

References

Butterflies of North America
Fauna of the Northwestern United States
Pyrginae
Butterflies described in 1852